Digital Dera "ڈیجییٹل ڈیرہ" is an initiative to digitalize the agriculture sector in remote fertile lands of South Punjab by providing a community internet network to local farmers. It was established with the collaboration of Agriculture Republic, Internet Society, Accountability Lab, PTCL, and Hayat Farms in remote agricultural land of Chak No. 26/SP, District Pakpattan. It aims to provide free internet connectivity for better access to digital agricultural resources. The future goal is to introduce agriculture-based smart villages through IoT integration.

Background 
A group of progressive agricultural entrepreneurs from South Punjab who previously founded "Agriculture Republic", an Agriculture Think Tank, decided to start Digital Dera with NGOs' help and the support of Director General Agriculture (Punjab Agriculture Department). It is part of the "Digital Agriculture Community Network Project", targeting more than 1500 farmers in the rural belt of South Punjab.

Digital Hujra 
"Digital Hujra" is another initiative to serve same purposes in Khyber Pakhtunkhwa province as "Digital Dera" is serving in Punjab province. Digital Hujra center is established in University of Malakand, Chakdara, Lower Dir District of Khyber Pakhtunkhwa. Experts in the center will provide necessary assistance to the surrounding villages such as Ramora, Ali Mast, Gul Muqam, Darbar and Sehsada in Adenzai Tehsil.

See also
Smart villages in Asia
Agriculture in Pakistan

References 

Agriculture in Pakistan
Agriculture in Punjab, Pakistan